David "Dave" Hawley is a former professional rugby league footballer who played in the 1960s and 1970s.

Playing career

Championship final appearances
Dave Hawley played , in Wakefield Trinity's 17-10 victory over Hull Kingston Rovers in the Championship Final during the 1967-68 season at Headingley, Leeds on Saturday 4 May 1968.

Challenge Cup Final appearances
Dave Hawley played , in Wakefield Trinity's 10-11 defeat by Leeds in the 1968 Challenge Cup "Watersplash" Final during the 1967–68 season at Wembley Stadium, London on Saturday 11 May 1968, in front of a crowd of 87,100.

References

External links
Search for "Hawley" at rugbyleagueproject.org
SportsFile: Caught in Time: Leeds win the Challenge Cup, 1968
Rugby Cup Final 1968

Living people
English rugby league players
Place of birth missing (living people)
Wakefield Trinity players
Year of birth missing (living people)
Rugby league locks